Chantelle was a popular merengue musical group from Puerto Rico, which performed from the late 1980s to the early 1990s. The group's name comes from the popular French feminine given name (translated to "Chantal" in Spanish and English).

Formed in 1988, Chantelle was an all-female music group, which is somewhat of a rarity for tropical music bands. One of their few predecessors in that respect was "Las Chicas Del Can", a Merengue group from Dominican Republic, that performed during the middle 1980s.

In 1989, Chantelle became known on the Puerto Rican and Latin American airwaves with their biggest hit, "Aunque Tú No Quieras" ("Even if you Don't Want to"). That song was about a girl telling her boyfriend that they had to separate, despite their feelings. This song gave Chantelle television and radio coverage, and the three girls in the group (Olga Tañón, Sandra Torres and Daly Fontanez) became famous women, although Olga Tañón became the most famous of the three. The group received a Lo Nuestro award for "Tropical New Artist of the Year" at the 1990 Lo Nuestro Awards.

References

Puerto Rican musical groups
Merengue music groups
Musical groups established in 1988
Musical groups disestablished in 1991
All-female bands